Frank B. Bergeron (February 6, 1927 - May 4, 2020) was a Canadian professional hockey player who played for the Buffalo Bisons, Springfield Indians and Syracuse Warriors in the American Hockey League. He also played in the Pacific Coast Hockey League for the San Francisco Shamrocks, in the United States Hockey League for the Minneapolis Millers, and in the Maritime Major Hockey League.

References

External links
 

1927 births
2020 deaths
Canadian ice hockey defencemen
Ice hockey people from Ontario
Buffalo Bisons (AHL) players
Minneapolis Millers (AHA) players
People from the United Counties of Stormont, Dundas and Glengarry
Springfield Indians players
Syracuse Warriors players
San Francisco Shamrocks players